The cat (Felis silvestris catus), also known as the domestic cat or house cat to distinguish it from other felines, is a small carnivorous species of crepuscular mammal that is often valued by humans for its companionship and its ability to hunt vermin.

Lists of cats include:
 List of individual cats – individual notable cats
 List of cat breeds
 List of experimental cat breeds
 List of fictional cats
 List of fictional cats in animation
 List of fictional cats in comics
 List of fictional cats in film
 List of fictional cats in literature
 List of fictional cats in television